Robson's Extreme Fishing Challenge is a British factual entertainment show broadcast on Channel 5 and a spin-off series to Extreme Fishing with Robson Green. The show sees actor and fishing enthusiast Robson Green travel around the world to some of the greatest fishing destinations, where he challenges local masters of their craft over five rounds of competitive fishing.

Episodes

Series 1

Series 2

Series 3

See also 
 Channel 5 (UK)
 Extreme Fishing with Robson Green

External links
 
 TV review: Robson's Extreme Fishing Challenge from The Guardian

2012 British television series debuts
2014 British television series endings
2010s British reality television series
English-language television shows
Channel 5 (British TV channel) original programming
Fishing television series